The Nokia N97 is a high-end smartphone introduced on 2 December 2008 by telecommunications manufacturer Nokia as part of its Nseries and released in June 2009 as the successor to the Nokia N96 phone. The N97 was Nokia's second S60-based touchscreen phone, after the Nokia 5800 XpressMusic. The device featured slide-out QWERTY keyboard, and ran on the Symbian v9.4 (Symbian^1/S60 5th Edition) operating system. Its design took cues from the Nokia N79. A smaller 'mini' version was later released.

At the time, the phone was Nokia's flagship device at a point where touchscreen devices were becoming increasingly prevalent, the N97 was highly anticipated. Despite respectable sales, in industry circles the phone was considered a hardware and software "disaster" that contributed to Nokia's decline. In 2010, a Nokia executive called the N97 a "regrettable failure".

Release
The Nokia N97 was released in US flagship stores on 9 June 2009, and worldwide on 26 June 2009. In September 2009, it was reported that some two million N97 handsets had been sold in the three months after its release.

The N97 shipped with trial versions of Quick Office, Adobe Reader, Boingo, Joikuspot, Ovi Maps, and Ovi store software applications.

The device's initial software met a mixed reception, prompting the release of new firmware in October 2009. Nokia released the new firmware with kinetic scrolling for the N97 to address drawbacks in the initial firmware release.

In October 2009, the N97 Mini, a smaller version of the original N97, was introduced. The N97 Mini was regarded as an improvement over the original N97.

Operating times
Informal tests found that the N97's battery could hold a charge through nearly two days of the original N97's regular use. Nokia claimed the following operating times:
Talk time: Up to 6.0 hours (3G), 9.5 hours (GSM)
Standby time: Up to 17 days (3G), 18 days (GSM)
Video playback: Up to 4.5 hours (offline mode)
Video recording: Up to 3.6 hours (offline mode)
Music playback: Up to 40 hours (offline mode)

Special applications
With the optional DVB-H Nokia Mobile TV receiver, SU-33W it became possible to watch television on the phone. This was compatible with Nokia's N-Gage platform, the only touchscreen with this capability at the time.

Reception

Criticism of the original N97 included its relative lack of RAM and available storage. With only 50MB of free RAM after boot, the phone could become sluggish and close applications to conserve memory. Many first-party applications would install only on the root partition and with around 50MB of free space, this was used quickly in competition with the needs of temporary OS files. The N97 Mini resolved this issue, often offering users over 250MB of free space in fixed storage. A memory mapping change from firmware version 20 enabled applications to use less RAM and to better disengage, which eased the strain of less free RAM to the end-user.

Anssi Vanjoki, Nokia's EVP of Markets admitted that quality control of the device's software was troublesome, saying "it has been a tremendous disappointment in terms of the experience quality for the consumers", though Vanjoki later claimed that the issue could be repaired by firmware updates.

Steve Litchfield of "All About Symbian" wrote in a 2011 blog post: "The N97 really was the device that should have ruled the world - it had, almost literally, everything. And yet it became the one device that Nokia had to (literally) apologize for, publicly. The one device that became a millstone around its neck."

Nokia acknowledged that on many units the covers and lenses were mounted too closely, resulting in scratches from dust and debris. On later units, Nokia reportedly fixed this issue.

Other early adopters of the N97 encountered speed problems with the phone's built-in GPS lock. The phones lost track of their current locations, making Nokia's free turn-by-turn navigation software unusable. Users were offered under-warranty repairs for lens cover and GPS issues at official Nokia service centers.

Although Nokia phones traditionally had provided strong signal reception, the Nokia N97 fell short in this area, demonstrating poor signal strength, even when compared side by side to other phones connected to the same network.

The user interface of the S60 5th edition software platform, built on top of Symbian OS 9.4, was criticized by the TechRadar site as inconsistent, insofar as menu items required two taps to activate. In 2010 Nokia apologized to customers who had experienced shortcomings with the N97 and its software.

Despite generally lukewarm reviews, the phone sold well. However its marketing as an "iPhone killer" tarnished Nokia's smartphone reputation at the time.

Nokia N97 Mini
The N97 Mini was a downsized version of the N97 introduced in October 2009. The N97 Mini downsized some features of the original N97, such as 8 GB of storage memory,  touchscreen, and a shorter battery life. It used the 2.0 Nokia N97 software by default. The keypad was somewhat redesigned. The big D-pad on the left side was replaced by four arrow keys on the right side. There also was more space between each key, and keys were a bit higher, which offered better tactile sense when typing.

This table lists significant differences.

A limited edition, the "N97 mini Raoul Limited Edition" was released in collaboration with fashion house FJ Benjamin and the  Raoul brand. It also featured a Fashion Asia widget and became available in late October 2009 in Malaysia and Singapore.

Reception
The user interface of the S60 5th edition software platform, built on top of Symbian OS 9.4, was criticized by the TechRadar site as being inconsistent, insofar as menu items required two taps to be activated.

When compared to the original N97, the cheaper N97 mini was regarded in reviews as an improvement, especially its keyboard.

Successor
There are three phones considered as successors to the N97. Firstly is the N8, as it became the new multimedia flagship for 2010. Also is the C6, which had a similar sliding-out QWERTY keyboard - however since the C6 uses the same specifications, the Maemo-powered N900, also featuring the keyboard, yet considerably better specifications have been considered the successor.

See also
BlackBerry Storm
Daxian N97
HTC Touch Pro2
HTC Hero
iPhone 3GS
Nokia 5800 XpressMusic
Nokia C6-00
Nokia E7
Nokia N900
Palm Pre
Samsung i8910 Omnia HD
Sony Ericsson Satio

References

External links

Nokia N97 demonstration video
Nokia N97 Discussion Forum
Nokia N97 Data sheet
Official Nokia N97 website launched
Nokia N97 detailed specifications
Review: Nokia N97 mini by Chris Targett 12 May 2010 rather positive review of the mini
The stress test of Nokia N97 (93 points from 100 possible)

N-Gage (service) compatible devices
Mobile phones with an integrated hardware keyboard
Mobile phones introduced in 2009
Nokia Nseries
Mobile phones with user-replaceable battery
Slider phones